Pseudopanax arboreus or five finger (Māori: puahou or whauwhaupaku), is a New Zealand native tree belonging to the family Araliaceae. It is one of New Zealand's more common native trees, being found widely in bush, scrub and gardens throughout both islands. The compound leaves with five to seven leaflets, hence the common name, are very characteristic of the tree and easily recognized.

Closely related and very similar to five finger are P. laetus, P. colensoi and P. macintyrei.

Description
Leaflets obovate-oblong to oblong-cuneate, thinly coriaceous, coarsely serrate-dentate. Flowers usually unisexual; inflorescences are compound umbels with 8-20 primary branchlets up to 10 cm long, 15-20 secondary rays, umbellules with 10-15 flowers in each. Calyx truncate or obscurely 5-toothed; flowers 5mm in diameter, sweet-scented; petals 5, white to pink flushed, ovate to triangular, acute; stamens 5; ovary 2-loculed, each containing 1(-2) ovules; style branches 2, spreading. Fruit fleshy, very dark purple, laterally compressed, 5–8 mm diam.; style branches retained on an apical disc. Seeds 2(-3) per fruit, wrinkled, 3–6 mm long.

Ecology
Pseudopanax arboreus is a host species for the caterpillar of the endemic North Island moth Declana atronivea.

References

New Zealand Plant Conservation Network, URL:Pseudopanax arboreus. Accessed 2010-10-04.

arboreus
Trees of New Zealand
Endemic flora of New Zealand